This is a list of architecture schools in Switzerland.

Universities/Swiss Federal Institutes of Technology 

ETH Zurich: ETH Zurich Faculty of Architecture (D-ARCH), Zürich, http://www.arch.ethz.ch
EPFL, École Polytechnique Fédérale de Lausanne, Faculté Environnement, Naturel, Architectural et Construit (ENAC), Section d'architecture (SAR),  Lausanne, http://sar.epfl.ch
University of Lugano (USI), L'Accademia di Architettura di Mendrisio (AAM), http://www.arch.unisi.ch

Universities of Applied Science 
Zurich University of Applied Sciences (ZFH), The School of Architecture, Design and Civil Engineering, Winterthur, https://web.archive.org/web/20121020023630/http://www.archbau.zhaw.ch/
Berne University of Applied Sciences, Architektur, Holz und Bau, Burgdorf, http://www.bfh.ch
Lucerne University of Applied Sciences and Arts (Hochschule Luzern – Technik & Architektur, Horw, http://www.hslu.ch
Fachhochschule Nordwestschweiz, Basel, http://www.fhnw.ch
Hochschule für Technik Zürich, Zürich, http://www.hsz-t.ch
Haute École du paysage, d'ingénierie et d'architecture de Genève, Genève, http://hepia.hesge.ch
Hochschule für Technik und Architektur Freiburg, Fribourg, http://www.eif.ch
Scuola Universitaria Professionale della Svizzera Italiana (SUPSI), Lugano, http://www.supsi.ch/home.html

See also
List of largest universities by enrollment in Switzerland

 
Schools
Architecture schools